The Best of Collin Raye: Direct Hits is American country music artist Collin Raye's first greatest hits album. Released on August 26, 1997 via Epic Records, the album contains the greatest hits from his first studio albums plus several new tracks.

Among the new recordings were three singles. "What the Heart Wants" and "Little Red Rodeo" were both Top 5 hits on the country charts. "The Gift", a collaboration with Jim Brickman and Susan Ashton, was released only to the adult contemporary format. Also included on the album is a cover of Journey's "Open Arms".

In October 1998 the album was certified Platinum by the RIAA.

Track listing

 1Previously unreleased track.

Production 
 "Love, Me" produced by Jerry Fuller and John Hobbs
 "In This Life" and "That Was a River" produced by Garth Fundis and John Hobbs
 "The Gift," "Open Arms," "Little Red Rodeo" produced by Billy Joe Walker Jr., Paul Worley and Collin Raye
 All other tracks produced by Paul Worley, John Hobbs and Ed Seay

Personnel 
The following musicians perform on tracks 10 through 13:
 Susan Ashton – background vocals on "The Gift"
 Jim Brickman – piano on "The Gift"
 Larry Byrom – electric guitar on "The Gift," "Open Arms" and "Little Red Rodeo"
 Joe Chemay – bass guitar on all tracks, background vocals on "What the Heart Wants," "Open Arms" and "Little Red Rodeo"
 Larry Franklin – fiddle on "Open Arms" and "Little Red Rodeo"
 Paul Franklin – steel guitar and Dobro on "What the Heart Wants"
 Sonny Garrish – steel guitar on "The Gift," "Open Arms" and "Little Red Rodeo"
 Steve Gibson – mandolin on "What the Heart Wants"
 John Hobbs – keyboards on "What the Heart Wants" and "The Gift"
 Dann Huff – electric guitar on "What the Heart Wants" and "The Gift"
 Paul Leim – drums on all tracks
 Anthony Martin – background vocals on "What the Heart Wants"
 Gene Miller – background vocals on "What the Heart Wants," "Open Arms" and "Little Red Rodeo"
 Steve Nathan – piano on "Open Arms" and "Little Red Rodeo"
 Collin Raye – lead vocals on all tracks
 John Wesley Ryles – background vocals on "What the Heart Wants"
 Will Smith – autoharp on "What the Heart Wants"
 Billy Joe Walker Jr. – acoustic guitar on all tracks, electric guitar on "Open Arms" and "Little Red Rodeo"
 Biff Watson – acoustic guitar on "What the Heart Wants," "Open Arms" and "Little Red Rodeo"
 Dennis Wilson – background vocals on "What the Heart Wants," "Open Arms" and "Little Red Rodeo"
 Paul Worley – acoustic guitar on "What the Heart Wants"

Charts

Weekly charts

Year-end charts

References 

1997 greatest hits albums
Collin Raye albums
Epic Records compilation albums